= Murayama Taka =

Japanese geisha

Murayama Taka (村山 たか; 1809 – 1876) (also known as Murayama Kazue) was a geisha in the late Edo period who became known for her involvement in political affairs as the concubine of Nagano Shuzen.

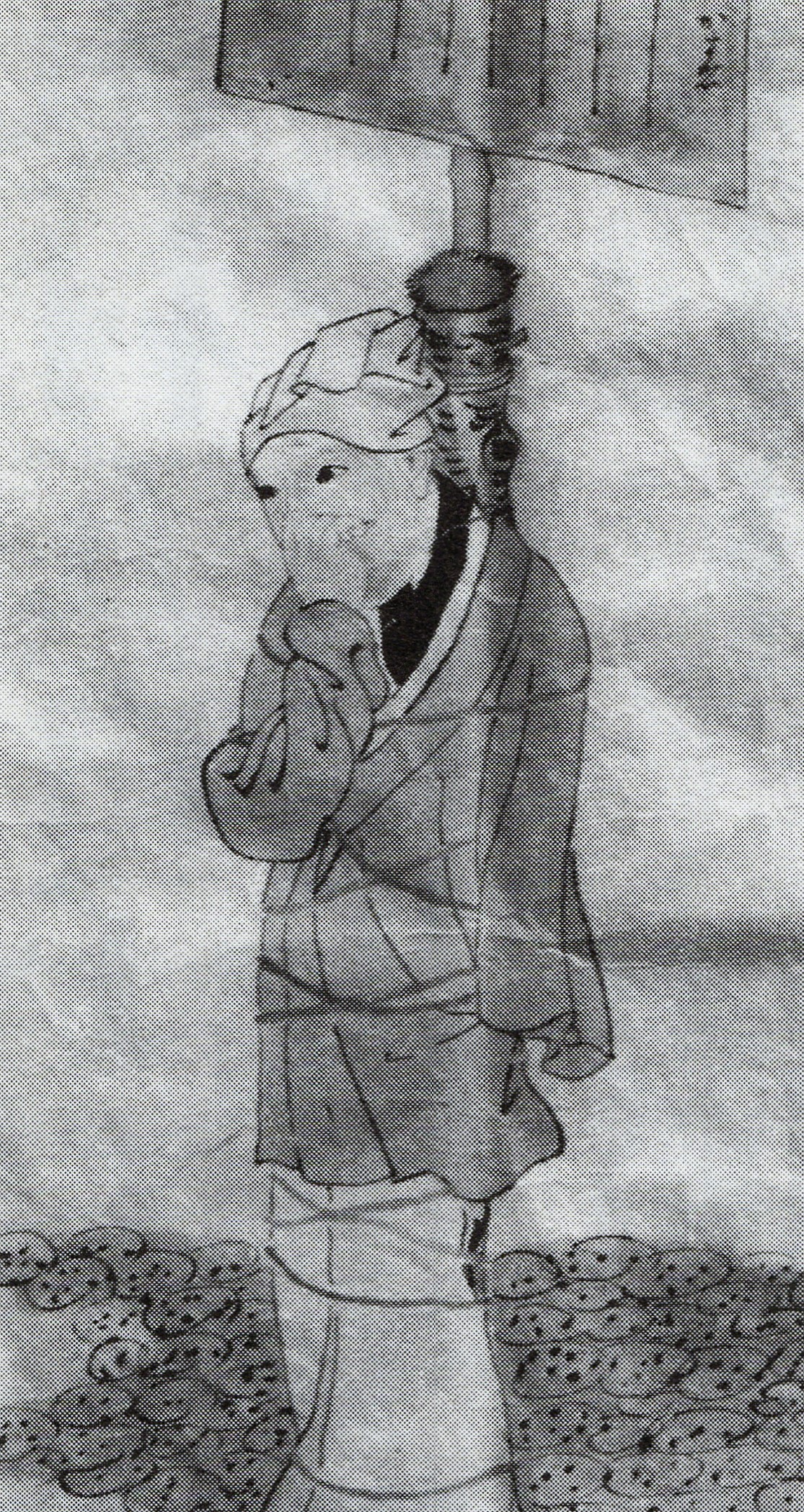
